Rinshō, Rinsho or Rinshou (written: 麟祥 or 林昌) is a masculine Japanese given name. Notable people with the name include:

, Japanese singer
, Japanese jurist and educator

Japanese masculine given names